Brandon Kenneth Bell, professionally known as Donut, is an American record producer and songwriter. Donut has produced songs for artists such as Jeremih, PnB Rock and Fergie.

Discography

References 

Living people
Writers from Houston
Musicians from Houston
African-American songwriters
21st-century African-American male singers
American contemporary R&B singers
American male pop singers
American hip hop singers
African-American record producers
American hip hop record producers
Songwriters from Texas
Record producers from Texas
21st-century American male singers
21st-century American singers
Year of birth missing (living people)
American male songwriters